The 1998 Big 12 Conference softball tournament was held at ASA Hall of Fame Stadium in Oklahoma City, OK from April 30 through May 3, 1998. Nebraska won their first conference tournament and earned the Big 12 Conference's automatic bid to the 1998 NCAA Division I softball tournament. 

Nebraska, Texas and Oklahoma State would go on to play in the 1998 Women's College World Series.

Standings
Source:

Schedule
Source:

All-Tournament Team
Source:

References

Big 12 Conference softball tournament
Tournament
Big 12 softball tournament